Rodolfo Gustavo da Paixão (13 July 1853 - 18 November 1925) was a Brazilian marshal and politician, who served as the Governor of the state of Goiás twice, February 1890 to January 1891, and again July to December 1891. He was decorated with the Knight of the Military Order of Avis and Gold Military Medal.

References

1853 births
1925 deaths
19th-century Brazilian military personnel
Place of birth missing
Place of death missing
Governors of Goiás